"Don't Tread on Me" is the first single by the group 311 from their album of the same name. The single, an original composition written by the band's members, was released in 2005. It became their seventh top-five hit on the Billboard Alternative Songs chart.

Chart performance

References

2005 singles
311 (band) songs
2005 songs
Songs written by Nick Hexum
Songs written by SA Martinez
Songs written by P-Nut